The 1803 Massachusetts gubernatorial election was held on April 4.

Federalist Governor Caleb Strong was re-elected to a fourth consecutive one-year term in office, defeating Democratic-Republican Elbridge Gerry again for the fourth time.

General election

Results

References

Governor
1803
Massachusetts
April 1803 events